Igor Nesterenko (born August 18, 1990) is an Israeli-Ukrainian professional basketball player for Maccabi Rishon LeZion of the Israeli Basketball Premier League in Israel.

Early life
Nesterenko was born in Kiliya, Ukraine, to a Jewish family. Nesterenko lived his first three years in Ukraine before growing up in Rishon LeZion, Israel. He played for the Maccabi Rishon LeZion youth team and the Gymnasia Realit high school team.

Professional career
In 2008, Nesterenko started his professional career with Maccabi Rishon LeZion. On November 1, 2008, he made his professional debut in a match against Maccabi Haifa.

In his fourth season with Rishon LeZion, Nesterenko was loaned to Elitzur Yavne of the Liga Leumit. In his seventh season, Nesterenko helped Rishon LeZion reach the 2015 Israeli League Semifinals, where they eventually were eliminated by Hapoel Jerusalem.

On August 17, 2015, Nesterenko signed a one-year deal with Ironi Nes Ziona.

On July 5, 2016, Nesterenko signed with Ironi Nahariya for the 2016–17 season. Nesterenko helped Nahariya reach the 2017 Israeli League Quarterfinals, as well as reaching the 2017 FIBA Europe Cup Quarterfinals, where they eventually were eliminated by Telekom Baskets Bonn.

On July 23, 2017, Nesterenko signed a two-year contract extension with Ironi Nahariya. On January 3, 2018, Nesterenko recorded a career-high 20 points, shooting 7-of-8 from the field, along with four rebounds and three assists in a 90–98 loss to Hapoel Holon. In 33 games played during the 2017–18 season, he averaged 7.2 points and 4.9 rebounds per game.

On September 8, 2019, Nesterenko joined Hapoel Haifa of the Israeli National League, signing a one-year deal with an option for another one.

References

External links
 RealGM profile

1990 births
Living people
Centers (basketball)
Hapoel Haifa B.C. players
Ironi Nahariya players
Ironi Nes Ziona B.C. players
Israeli Basketball Premier League players
Israeli Jews
Israeli men's basketball players
Maccabi Rishon LeZion basketball players
Ukrainian emigrants to Israel
Ukrainian Jews
Ukrainian men's basketball players
Sportspeople from Rishon LeZion